The 2020–21 Sint-Truidense V.V. season was the club's 97th season in existence and its sixth consecutive season in the top flight of Belgian football. In addition to the domestic league, Sint-Truiden participated in this season's edition of the Belgian Cup. The season covered the period from 1 July 2020 to 30 June 2021.

Players

First-team squad

On loan

Transfers

In

Out

Pre-season and friendlies

Competitions

Overview

Belgian First Division A

League table

Results summary

Results by round

Matches
The league fixtures were announced on 8 July 2020.

Belgian Cup

Statistics

Goalscorers

References

External links

Sint-Truidense V.V.
Sint-Truiden